Blair Atholl railway station is a railway station serving the town of Blair Atholl, Perth and Kinross, Scotland. There is a crossover at the north end of the station to allow trains to turn back if the line south to Pitlochry is closed.

History

The station was opened by the Inverness and Perth Junction Railway on 9 September 1863 and is located at the northern end of the single track portion of the route from Stanley Junction.

One of the first visitors to the station was Queen Victoria who arrived in a Royal Train on 15 September 1863 on a visit to Blair Castle to see George Murray, 6th Duke of Atholl who was very ill.

The disused goods yard and associated pointwork still exist, though overgrown. The goods yard is located next to the northbound platform.

Facilities 
There are benches on both platforms, with a waiting shelter on platform 2 and natural shelter from the station buildings on platform 1, with a small car park and bike racks adjacent to the latter. As well as the footbridge between the platforms, there is also step-free access to both platforms (from the car park to platform 1 and from the level crossing to platform 2). As there are no facilities to purchase tickets, passengers must buy one in advance, or from the guard on the train.

Platform layout 
Platform 1 on the southbound line can accommodate trains having seven coaches, whereas platform 2 on the northbound line can hold eleven.

Passenger volume 

The statistics cover twelve month periods that start in April.

Services

As of the May 2022 timetable, on weekdays and Saturdays there are 5 trains per day northbound (all going to Inverness), and 6 trains per day southbound (three to Glasgow Queen Street, two to Edinburgh and the southbound Caledonian Sleeper, picking up only, weekdays only). A reduced service operates on Sundays, with 3 trains per day to Inverness (1 of which extends to Elgin), and 2 trains to Glasgow and 2 trains to Edinburgh, including the Highland Chieftain to London Kings Cross, as well as the Caledonian Sleeper.

References

External links 

 Video footage of the station on YouTube

Railway stations in Perth and Kinross
Former Highland Railway stations
Railway stations in Great Britain opened in 1863
Railway stations served by ScotRail
Railway stations served by Caledonian Sleeper
Railway stations served by London North Eastern Railway